Pharga is a genus of moths in the family Erebidae. The genus was erected by Francis Walker in 1863.

Taxonomy
The genus was previously classified in the subfamily Calpinae of the family Noctuidae.

Species
Pharga barbara Schaus, 1915 Rio de Janeiro in Brazil
Pharga pallens (Barnes & McDunnough, 1911) Arizona in the US
Pharga pholausalis (Walker, [1859]) Venezuela

References

Scolecocampinae
Moth genera